Richard Clifford Surhoff Jr. (November 16, 1929 – May 1, 1987) was an American professional basketball player. Surhoff was selected in the 1952 NBA draft by the New York Knicks after a collegiate career at Long Island and John Marshall College. He played for two seasons, one for the Knicks and the other for the Milwaukee Hawks.

Dick Surhoff was the father of professional baseball players Rick and B. J. Surhoff. He was also the grandfather of Brian and Colin Moran.

References

1929 births
1987 deaths
Basketball players from New York (state)
LIU Brooklyn Blackbirds men's basketball players
Milwaukee Hawks players
New York Knicks draft picks
New York Knicks players
Power forwards (basketball)
Small forwards
American men's basketball players